The Pac-12 Most Improved Player of The Year is an annual college basketball award presented to the most improved player in men's basketball in the Pac-12 Conference. The winner is selected by conference coaches, who are not allowed to vote for players on their own team.  The award began in 2009 when the conference consisted of 10 teams and was known as the Pacific-10.  The conference added two teams and became the Pac-12 in 2011.  

Justin Dentmon of Washington was the conferences first Most Improved Player of the Year in 2009. The most recent winner of the award is Oumar Ballo of the Arizona Wildcats.

Winners

Winners by school

References

Awards established in 2009
College basketball conference trophies and awards in the United States
Most Improved Player of The Year